Caroline Dolehide was the defending champion, having won the previous edition in 2019, however she chose to participate in qualifying for Wimbledon instead.

Despina Papamichail won the title, defeating Gabriela Cé in the final, 1–6, 6–3, 6–3.

Seeds

Draw

Finals

Top half

Bottom half

References

Main Draw

LTP Charleston Pro Tennis II - Singles
LTP Charleston Pro Tennis